Walker Mountains is a range of peaks and nunataks which are fairly well separated but trend east–west to form the axis, or spine, of Thurston Island in Antarctica. They were discovered by Rear Admiral Byrd and members of the US Antarctic Service in a flight from the ship Bear on February 27, 1940. It was named by the Advisory Committee on Antarctic Names for Lt. William M. Walker, captain of the United States Exploring Expedition ship Island on March 23, 1839.

Peaks
 Mount Borgeson
 Mount Bramhall
 Mount Caldwell
 Dickens Peak
 Mount Hawthorne
 Mount Kazukaitis
 Landfall Peak
 Mount Leech
 Litz Bluff
 Mount Lopez
 Lowe Nunataks
 Mount Noxon
 Parker Peak
 Mount Simpson
 Smith Peak (Antarctica)
 Zuhn Bluff

Maps
 Thurston Island – Jones Mountains. 1:500000 Antarctica Sketch Map. US Geological Survey, 1967.
 Antarctic Digital Database (ADD). Scale 1:250000 topographic map of Antarctica. Scientific Committee on Antarctic Research (SCAR), 1993–2016.

Mountain ranges of Ellsworth Land
Thurston Island